Shah Rasul (also Romanized as Shāh Rasūl; also known as Shāh Rasūl-e Pā’īn) is a village in Tula Rud Rural District, in the Central District of Talesh County, Gilan Province, Iran. At the 2006 census, its population was 58, in 13 families.

References 

Populated places in Talesh County